Eudmetoceras is an extinct genus from a well-known class of fossil cephalopods, the ammonites. It lived during the Jurassic Period, which lasted from 171.6 to 168.4 million years ago.

References

Hammatoceratidae
Ammonitida genera
Jurassic ammonites
Fossils of British Columbia
Fossils of Spain